Aquimarina addita  is a Gram-negative, strictly aerobic, rod-shaped and non-motile bacterium from the genus of Aquimarina which has been isolated from seawater from the Jeju Island in Korea.

References 

Flavobacteria
Bacteria described in 2011